The Australian Pacing Championship is a harness racing event showcasing some of Australia's and New Zealand’s best pacers. It is currently held annually at Gloucester Park in Perth.

Results

 Race recorded in km rate (time in brackets is converted mile rate)
 Inquiry conducted by WATA Stewards 17/12/03 and subsequent appeal on 7/7/04 disqualified Backinafalcon from 1st placing.

References

 Harness Racing Australia Racing Chronicles

Australasian Grand Circuit Races
Harness races in Australia